A Jalopy is an old car that is often in a barely functional state.

Jalopy may also refer to:

Automobiles
 Lemon (automobile), a defective automobile
 Rat rod, an updated term for a modern interpretation of a jalopy, not to be confused with a traditional hot rod

Other
 Jalopy (film), a 1953 film starring The Bowery Boys
 Jalopy (video game), an indie game developed by Minskworks.